Adenosine 5′-tetraphosphate, Ap4 or ATPP is a nucleotide. It is produced from ATP and triphosphate (P3) through the action of acetyl—CoA synthetase. Acetyl—CoA synthetase also produces adenosine 5'-pentaphosphate through the reaction of ADP and tetraphosphate (P4).

Functions 
ATPP has been found to play physiological roles in some mammals.

Rabbits 
ATPP is a constituent of aqueous humor in rabbits, where it was found to reduce the intraocular pressure.

Rats 
ATPP has been suggested to play a regulatory role in rat aorta.

References

Nucleotides
Phosphate esters